Bouzareah or Bouzaréah is a suburb of Algiers, Algeria. It had a population of 69,200 people in 1998 and an altitude of over 300 meters AMSL. The city's name is Arabic and means "of the grain" or "from the grain". The embassies of Niger, Oman, and Mauritania are located there.

Institutions
The city is home to several notable institutions:
 The Algerian Space Agency
 The Research center in Astronomy, Astrophysics and Geophysics (CRAAG, former Observatory of Algiers)
 The normal School for Teachers of Algiers-Bouzaréah, created by imperial decree on March 4, 1865
 The Tele Algerian Diffusion
 The broadcast transmitting station of the operator of mobile telephony Djezzy, subsidiary of Orascom Télécom Algeria, which is the largest telephone operator in Algeria.
 The Department of Sciences of Education - the University of Bouzaréah
 The Superior school of Bank
 The basilica Notre Dame d'Afrique
 The forest of Baïnem

Asteroid

Frederic Sy was a French astronomer who published scientific articles from 1894 to 1918 about comets and asteroids. He worked at the astronomical observatory the Research center in Astronomy, Astrophysique and Geophysics (CRAAG, formerly the Observatory of Algiers) and was a colleague of François Gonnessiat.  He discovered two asteroids, which he named:
 "858 El Djezaïr" (Arabic for Algeria and Algiers) on May 26, 1916.
 "859 Bouzaréah" also in 1916.

Historical population

Former coat of arms
The first quarter is red, the heraldic color of Africa with a tower to represent a fort located in the city. The second quarter is green, of sinople with a kouba to point out the koubbas of Sidi-Nouman inter alia.  With the third district, sinople cypresses to point out the wooded solid mass which covered formerly all the "Bouzaréah".  With the fourth district the crescent of Islam with the stars which refer to the Observatory of the Celestial Village on blue of France.

This coat of arms was made by Théo Bruand d' Uzelle in 1993.

Education
El Kalimat School, an English-language international school, is in the commune.

Notable people

References

Suburbs of Algiers
Communes of Algiers Province